XHREZ-FM is a noncommercial radio station on 93.1 FM in Tuxtla Gutiérrez, Chiapas, Mexico, known as Bella Música 93.1.

History
XHREZ received its permit on June 6, 2000.

References

External links
Grupo Radio Digital Website

2000 establishments in Mexico
Radio stations established in 2000
Radio stations in Chiapas
Spanish-language radio stations